Zendaya is an American actress and singer who has received various accolades throughout her career, including two Primetime Emmy Awards, a Critics' Choice Television Award, a Golden Globe Award, a Satellite Award and a Saturn Award, as well as earning nominations for an AACTA Award, a Critics' Choice Movie Award and a Screen Actors Guild Award.

From 2010 to 2013, Zendaya starred in the Disney Channel sitcom Shake It Up. For her performance as Rocky Blue and her work on the show's soundtrack, she was nominated for two NAACP Image Awards, one Radio Disney Music Award and three Young Artist Awards. She played the titular character in the sitcom K.C. Undercover (2015–2018), which won her three Kids' Choice Awards for Favorite Female TV Star.

Her film roles include a supporting part as a trapeze artist in the musical drama The Greatest Showman (2017), for which she won various Kids' Choice Awards and Teen Choice Awards, and the leading role in the romantic-drama Malcolm & Marie (2021), which she also produced and earned her a nomination for the Critics' Choice Movie Award for Best Actress. Zendaya has portrayed MJ in the Marvel Cinematic Universe starting from the 2017 film Spider-Man: Homecoming, and won the Saturn Award for Best Supporting Actress for its sequel Far from Home (2019).

Since 2019, Zendaya stars as Rue Bennett on the HBO teen drama series Euphoria, for which she won two Primetime Emmy Awards for Outstanding Lead Actress in a Drama Series. At age 24, she is the youngest winner of the Drama Lead Actress category in history and also the second African American to win the award, following Viola Davis. She received four nominations at the 74th Primetime Emmy Awards, including Outstanding Drama Series, making her the youngest producer nominee ever at the Emmy Awards. For this role, she has also won the Golden Globe Award for Best Actress in a Television Series – Drama along with a BET Award, three Black Reel Awards, a Critics' Choice Television Award and a Satellite Award, while she has been nominated for a Screen Actors Guild Award.

Major associations

Critics' Choice Movie Awards
The Critics' Choice Movie Awards are an award show presented annually by the Canadian American Critics Choice Association (CCA) to honor the finest in cinematic achievement.

Critics' Choice Television Awards
The Critics' Choice Television Awards are accolades that are presented annually by the Canadian American Critics Choice Association (CCA) to honor the finest in television achievement.

Golden Globe Awards
The Golden Globe Awards are accolades bestowed by the Hollywood Foreign Press Association (HFPA) to recognize excellence in both American and international film and television productions.

Primetime Emmy Awards
The Primetime Emmy Award is an American award bestowed by the Academy of Television Arts & Sciences (ATAS) in recognition of excellence in American primetime television programming.

Screen Actors Guild Awards
The Screen Actors Guild Awards are organized by the Screen Actors Guild‐American Federation of Television and Radio Artists (SAG-AFTRA). First awarded in 1995, the awards aim to recognize excellent achievements in film and television.

Miscellaneous awards

AACTA International Awards
The AACTA International Awards are presented annually by the Australian Academy of Cinema and Television Arts (AACTA) to recognize and honor achievements in the global film and television industry.

BET Awards
The BET Awards are an American award show established by the Black Entertainment Television (BET) network to celebrate African Americans and other American minorities in music, acting, sports, and other fields of entertainment over the past year.

Black Reel Awards
The Black Reel Awards are an annual American awards ceremony hosted by the Foundation for the Augmentation of African Americans in Film (FAAAF) to recognize excellence of African Americans, as well as the cinematic achievements of the African diaspora, in the global film industry, as assessed by the Foundation's voting membership.

CDFA Fashion Awards
The CDFA Fashion Awards are an annual ceremony hosted by the Council of Fashion Designers of America (CDFA). They were founded in 1980 to honor excellence in fashion design.

Critics' Choice Celebration of Black Cinema Awards
The Celebration of Black Cinema is an annual ceremony presented by the Canadian American Critics Choice Association (CCA) to honor the cinematic achievements of African American artists.

Critics' Choice Super Awards
The Critics' Choice Super Awards is an annual ceremony presented by the Canadian American Critics Choice Association (CCA) to honor the finest in genre fiction film, television and home media releases, including action, superhero, horror, science fiction, fantasy and animation releases.

Dorian Awards
The Dorian Awards are film and television accolades given by GALECA: The Society of LGBTQ Entertainment Critics, founded in 2009 as the Gay and Lesbian Entertainment Critics Association.

Glamour Awards
The Glamour Awards is an annual set of awards hosted by Glamour to honor "extraordinary and inspirational" women from a variety of fields, including entertainment, business, sports, music, science, medicine, education and politics.

IGN Awards
IGN is an American video game and entertainment media website operated by IGN Entertainment Inc.

iHeart Radio Music Awards
The iHeartRadio Music Awards is a music awards show that celebrates music heard throughout the year across iHeartMedia radio stations nationwide and on iHeartRadio, iHeartMedia's digital music platform.

MTV Movie & TV Awards
The MTV Movie & TV Awards is an annual award show presented by MTV to honor outstanding achievements in films. Founded in 1992, the winners of the awards are decided online by the audience.

NAACP Image Awards
The NAACP Image Awards are an annual awards ceremony presented by the US-based National Association for the Advancement of Colored People (NAACP) to honor outstanding performances in film, television, music, and literature.

Nickelodeon Kids' Choice Awards
The Nickelodeon Kids' Choice Awards are an annual American children's awards ceremony show that is produced by Nickelodeon.

People's Choice Awards
The People's Choice Awards is an American awards show, recognizing people in entertainment, voted online by the general public and fans.

Radio Disney Music Awards
The Radio Disney Music Awards (RDMA) is an annual awards show operated and governed by Radio Disney, an American radio network.

Satellite Awards
The Satellite Awards are annual awards given by the International Press Academy that are commonly noted in entertainment industry journals and blogs.

Saturn Awards
The Saturn Awards are American awards presented annually by the Academy of Science Fiction, Fantasy and Horror Films. They were initially created to honor science fiction, fantasy, and horror on film, but have since grown to reward other films belonging to genre fiction, as well as television and home media releases.

Shorty Awards
The Shorty Awards is an annual awards show recognizing the people and organizations that produce real-time short form content across Twitter, Facebook, YouTube, Instagram, TikTok, Twitch and the rest of the social web.

Teen Choice Awards
The Teen Choice Awards are an annual awards show that airs on the Fox television network. The awards honor the year's biggest achievements in music, film, sports, television, fashion, social media, and more, voted by viewers living in the US, aged 13 and over, through various social media sites.

Young Artist Awards
The Young Artist Award is an accolade presented by the Young Artist Foundation, a nonprofit organization founded in 1978 to honor excellence of youth performers.

Critics associations

Film festivals

Notes

References

External links 
  

Zendaya
Zendaya
Awards